Pritchardia lowreyana, the Molokai pritchardia,  is a species of fan palm that is endemic to Hawaii in the United States. It is found in mixed mesic and wet forests on the island of Molokai. It was named in 1918 for Cherilla Storrs Lowrey (1861–1918), an American clubwoman active in tree-planting and beautification projects around Honolulu.

References

lowreyana
Endemic flora of Hawaii
Biota of Molokai
Trees of Hawaii
Taxonomy articles created by Polbot